William Kenyon may refer to:

 William C. Kenyon (1898–1953), American football, basketball, and baseball coach at the University of Maine
 William S. Kenyon (Iowa politician) (1869–1933), U.S. Senator from Iowa from 1911 to 1922
 William S. Kenyon (New York politician) (1820–1896), U.S. Representative from New York

See also
 William Kenyon-Slaney (1847–1908), British sportsman, soldier, and politician